Philip Hayton (born 2 November 1947) is an English television news presenter, reporter and former international correspondent for BBC News. He worked for the BBC from 1968 until 2005.

Early life
Hayton was born on 2 November 1947, in the town of Keighley in Yorkshire, England. He was educated at Fyling Hall School, an Independent school near Robin Hood's Bay, North Yorkshire.

Career
Hayton began his broadcasting career as a pirate radio DJ on Radio 270, joining BBC Leeds in 1968. In 1974, he became a reporter for BBC News, covering a wide range of domestic and international news stories. He had a distinguished 37-year career at the BBC, reporting from Tehran, Iran as the 1979 Revolution took place, becoming a BBC correspondent in Washington D.C. and Southern Africa (based in Johannesburg), the latter of which involved reporting on the war in Rhodesia (later Zimbabwe), from 1980–83. He also reported from Eritrea during the war with Ethiopia and from Beirut during the civil war in the 1980s, narrowly escaping injury when the car he had been travelling in was blown up by a land mine shortly after he had got out.

From 1988 onwards, Hayton presented the BBC's One O'Clock News nationally, as well as becoming one of the main co-presenters of both the BBC's Six O'Clock News and the Nine O'Clock News programmes. In 1989, after the latter programme's change of presentation, he became one of its main solo presenters. Following this, he left national news to become the main presenter of BBC North West Tonight, but soon returned to the main news to present on BBC World and, eventually, BBC News 24. In addition, he hosted a mid-1990s BBC daytime quiz show entitled 'The Great British Quiz', which had previously been hosted by Janice Long.

In 1989, Hayton narrated Video 125's "Chiltern Take Two" drivers eye view video.

In September 2005, Hayton resigned from BBC News 24 six months into a year's contract, citing differences with co-presenter Kate Silverton. The Daily Telegraph, without substantiation and quoting an unnamed 'insider', reported that he turned to Silverton during a break and said "I don't like you". The Daily Mirror quoted another BBC 'insider' as saying that Silverton is "...pushy beyond belief. Behind her big superficial smile she can be a really aggressive, manipulative monster who always gets what she wants." Hayton merely cited "incompatibility" with Silverton as his reason and when his managers refused to move Silverton to another time slot he left. Silverton was later in the peculiar position of having to go through the morning's paper review live on air the morning the story broke, avoiding any discussion of the story and chiding her new co-anchor when he looked to refer to it. Hayton said that he left the BBC "without bitterness or rancour". Silverton continued to present on News 24 in the same weekly time slot alongside Simon McCoy.

In retirement, from 2007 onwards Hayton has been the regular host of Head2Head a BrightTALK internet broadcast for Skandia in which he holds court between two financial figures.

Personal life
Hayton is married to Thelma, and has a son, James, and a daughter, Julia.

Hayton describes his interests as walking, sailing and the theatre.

References

External links
 

1947 births
Living people
People educated at Fyling Hall School
People from Keighley
BBC newsreaders and journalists
BBC North West newsreaders and journalists
BBC World News